The 2004–05 Pittsburgh Panthers men's basketball team represented the University of Pittsburgh in the 2004–05 NCAA Division I men's basketball season. Led by head coach Jamie Dixon, the Panthers finished with a record of 20–9 and lost in the first round of the 2005 NCAA Division I men's basketball tournament where they lost to Pacific.

Schedule

Roster

References

Pittsburgh Panthers men's basketball seasons
Pittsburgh
Pittsburgh
Pittsburgh Pan
Pittsburgh Pan